Mireia Muñoz Pérez (born 24 December 1998) is a Spanish professional racing cyclist, who most recently rode for UCI Women's Continental Team .

References

External links
 

1998 births
Living people
Spanish female cyclists
People from Greater Bilbao
Sportspeople from Biscay
Cyclists from the Basque Country (autonomous community)